Rensselaer Central High School is a high school located in Rensselaer, Jasper County, Indiana. The school is administered by the Rensselaer Central Schools Corporation.

Athletics
Central is a member of the Hoosier Athletic Conference.  The school's athletic teams compete as the Bombers.  The following sports are offered at Central:

Baseball (boys)
Basketball (boys and girls)
Cross country (boys and girls)
Cheerleading (Girls)
Football (boys)
State champ - 2014
Golf (boys and girls)
Soccer (boys and girls)
Softball (girls)
Swimming (boys and girls)
Tennis (boys and girls)
Track (boys and girls)
Volleyball (girls)
Wrestling (boys and girls)

See also
 List of high schools in Indiana
 Hoosier Athletic Conference

References

External links
Rennsselaer Central High School

Educational institutions in the United States with year of establishment missing
Public high schools in Indiana
Schools in Jasper County, Indiana